Raphaël Jeune (born 25 February 1975) is a French former road cyclist.

He rode for Danish professional cycling team . He came to the team as a 'neo-pro' in 2001 and left the team one year later, in 2002.

Major results
2000
 1st Stage 7 Circuit des Mines
2001
 4th Overall Étoile de Bessèges

References

External links
 laszlo-bodrogi.com, photo, the rider to the left

1975 births
Living people
French male cyclists
Sportspeople from Besançon
Cyclists from Bourgogne-Franche-Comté